Bombali Shebora is a chiefdom of Bombali District in the Northern Province of Sierra Leone. The principal town lies at Makeni.

As of 2015 the chiefdom has a population of 36,407.

References

Chiefdoms of Sierra Leone
Northern Province, Sierra Leone
Makeni